Bryant Mitchell (born August 16, 1992) is a professional gridiron football wide receiver for the San Francisco 49ers of the National Football League (NFL). He played four years in the Canadian Football League. He played college football at Northwestern State.

Professional career

Edmonton Eskimos 
Mitchell played three seasons with the Edmonton Eskimos, taking on a more involved role in the offense each season. In total, he played 19 games for the Eskimos catching 97 passes for 1,418 yards with six touchdowns.

Arizona Cardinals
On January 10, 2019, Mitchell signed a reserve/future contract with the Arizona Cardinals. He was waived on May 10, 2019.

Tampa Bay Buccaneers
On May 16, 2019, Mitchell was signed by the Tampa Bay Buccaneers. He was placed on injured reserve on August 11, 2019 with a torn Achilles.

On March 19, 2020, Mitchell and the Buccaneers agreed to a new one-year contract. He was waived on September 5, 2020.

Winnipeg Blue Bombers
On February 10, 2021, it was announced that Mitchell had signed with the Winnipeg Blue Bombers. However, he announced his retirement in the following month on March 25, 2021.

San Francisco 49ers
On August 16, 2022 it was announced that Mitchell would sign a one-year deal with the San Francisco 49ers. On September 4, 2022, he was signed to the practice squad after being cut by the team.

References

Living people
1992 births
Players of American football from San Diego
Players of Canadian football from San Diego
American football wide receivers
Northwestern State Demons football players
Edmonton Elks players
Arizona Cardinals players
Tampa Bay Buccaneers players
Winnipeg Blue Bombers players
Canadian football wide receivers
American players of Canadian football
San Francisco 49ers players